Adontosternarchus is a genus of ghost knifefishes found in Amazon and Orinoco river basins in tropical South America.

Species
There are currently six recognized species in this genus:

 Adontosternarchus balaenops (Cope, 1878)
 Adontosternarchus clarkae Mago-Leccia, Lundberg & Baskin, 1985
 Adontosternarchus devenanzii Mago-Leccia, Lundberg & Baskin, 1985
 Adontosternarchus duartei de Santana & Vari, 2012
 Adontosternarchus nebulosus Lundberg & Cox Fernandes, 2007
 Adontosternarchus sachsi (W. K. H. Peters, 1877)

References

Apteronotidae
Fish of South America
Freshwater fish genera
Taxa named by Max Mapes Ellis